Heywood was a county constituency in the county of Lancashire of the House of Commons for the Parliament of the United Kingdom.  Created by the Redistribution of Seats Act 1885, it was represented by one Member of Parliament.  The constituency was abolished in 1918.

Boundaries and History 
This area had previously been represented as part of the South East Lancashire multi-seat division.  The Redistribution of Seats Act 1885 divided the former constituency into eight new single-member seats, one of which was designated South-East Lancashire, Heywood Division.

The constituency comprised the Municipal Borough of Heywood, the cotton town of Ramsbottom, and a number of surrounding townships, namely: Ainsworth, Ashworth, Pilkington, Tottington Higher End and the rural part of the parish of Spotland.

The constituency was mostly industrial but it included some agriculture.  The town of Heywood was the most Liberal part of the constituency, having an engineering-based economy; Ramsbottom was more marginal politically.  The countryside element of the constituency was Conservative inclined.  Overall the division was Liberal 1885–1895, Liberal Unionist 1895–1904 and after a change of allegiance by the sitting MP was Liberal again from 1904 until the constituency was abolished in 1918.

The constituency adjoined Westhoughton to the west, Rossendale to the north, Middleton and Rochdale to the east as well as Radcliffe-cum-Farnworth, Bury, and another part of the Middleton constituency to the south.

The Representation of the People Act 1918 abolished this constituency.  The successor seat was Heywood and Radcliffe.

Members of Parliament

Elections

Elections in the 1880s

Elections in the 1890s

Elections in the 1900s

Elections in the 1910s

General Election 1914–15:

Another General Election was required to take place before the end of 1915. The political parties had been making preparations for an election to take place and by the July 1914, the following candidates had been selected; 
Liberal: Harold Thomas Cawley
Unionist: Thomas Fermor-Hesketh

References

Sources

 Boundaries of Parliamentary Constituencies 1885–1972, compiled and edited by F.W.S. Craig (Parliamentary Reference Publications 1972)
 British Parliamentary Election Results 1885–1918, compiled and edited by F.W.S. Craig (Macmillan Press 1974)
 Social Geography of British Elections 1885–1910. by Henry Pelling (Macmillan 1967)
 Who's Who of British Members of Parliament, Volume II 1886–1918, edited by M. Stenton and S. Lees (Harvester Press 1978)
 Who's Who of British Members of Parliament, Volume III 1919–1945, edited by M. Stenton and S. Lees (Harvester Press 1979)

Parliamentary constituencies in North West England (historic)
Constituencies of the Parliament of the United Kingdom established in 1885
Constituencies of the Parliament of the United Kingdom disestablished in 1918
Heywood, Greater Manchester